Toku (also known as Toku-Suntsi) is a village in Antsla Parish, Võru County, in southeastern Estonia. With a population of 42 (as of 26 May 2004) it's the smallest village in the municipality.

See also
Toku Lake

References

Villages in Võru County